The 1993 Major League Baseball All-Star Game was the 64th playing of the midsummer classic between the all-stars of the American League (AL) and National League (NL), the two leagues comprising Major League Baseball. The game was held on July 13, 1993, at Oriole Park at Camden Yards in Baltimore, Maryland, the home of the Baltimore Orioles of the American League. The game resulted in the American League defeating the National League 9-3. 

This is also the last Major League Baseball All-Star Game to date to be televised by CBS and to be held in Baltimore. During the pregame broadcast coverage, CBS announced the passing of NASCAR driver Davey Allison from a helicopter accident the previous day.

Rosters
Players in italics have since been inducted into the National Baseball Hall of Fame.

National League

The trainers for the National League were Dave Labossiere of the Houston Astros, and Gene Gieselmann of the St.Louis Cardinals

American League

The trainers for the American League were Richie Bancells of the Baltimore Orioles, and Barry Weinberg of the Oakland Athletics.

Game

Umpires

Starting lineups

Game summary

See also: "1993 All-Star Game Play by Play".

The pregame colors presentation was from the color guard of the United States Naval Academy in Annapolis, Maryland.  Geddy Lee, lead singer of the band Rush later sang the Canadian National Anthem, while James Earl Jones recited the U.S. National Anthem, accompanied by the Morgan State University choir.At the conclusion of the National Anthem, fireworks exploded over Fort McHenry while airplanes from Andrews Air Force Base flew over Camden Yards.

To commemorate the 35th anniversary of the 1958 Major League Baseball All-Star Game, which had been played at Memorial Stadium, Hall-of-Famer and Baltimore native Al Kaline joined the ceremonial first pitch ceremonies.  Also joining the ceremonies was Orioles Hall-of-Famer Brooks Robinson.
The visiting National League scored in the first inning off starting pitcher Mark Langston when Barry Bonds doubled with one out and Gary Sheffield followed with a home run for a 2-0 lead.  The American League got a run back in the second when Kirby Puckett homered with one out off the NL starter, Terry Mulholland.  Roberto Alomar tied the game at two in the third inning, leading off with a home run, off Andy Benes.

The AL went ahead to stay with three runs in the fifth.  John Burkett came in to start the inning, and first batter Ivan Rodriguez doubled and scored on a single by Albert Belle, who went to second when Justice made an error on the play.  Ken Griffey Jr., singled home Belle and went to second on the throw home.  After Cecil Fielder was hit by a pitch, Kirby Puckett doubled home Griffey for the third run of the inning and a 5-2 AL lead.  Steve Avery relieved to get the last out of the inning.  The NL got a run back in the top of the sixth.  Jimmy Key started the inning and gave up a double to Bonds, followed by a single to Sheffield and a sacrifice fly to Barry Larkin, making the score 5-3.

The AL broke the game open in the bottom of the sixth with three more runs.  With two outs, Carlos Baerga reached on an error by shortstop Jeff Blauser, then Albert Belle walked.   Devon White doubled home Baerga and after John Smoltz relieved Avery, Belle scored and White went to third on a wild pitch.  Juan Gonzalez walked, then Smoltz threw his second wild pitch of the inning, allowing White to score the third run of the inning, giving the AL an 8-3 lead.  Smoltz tied an All-Star game record with two wild pitches, but he was the first to throw them in the same inning.

The AL got the last run of the game in the seventh inning when Greg Vaughn led off with a single and scored on a two-out double by Terry Steinbach, both hits off Rod Beck, making the final score 9-3. The last out however ended strangely, when American League (Blue Jays) manager Cito Gaston allowed  Blue Jays closer Duane Ward to close out the game in the ninth at Camden Yards, rather than hometown hero Mike Mussina. Fans cheered as the Orioles' Mike Mussina warmed up in the bullpen and chanted "We Want Mike!", but after the last out of the game, the fans booed Gaston for not putting in Mussina to close out the game. Fans began throwing various waste onto the field until an appeal from Mussina himself stopped the crowd. Mussina said that he warmed up so he would not mess up his regular pitching schedule, as he was going to pitch the next day. Despite this, many people believe that he started warming up so that the fans would get riled up, meaning that Gaston would most likely put him in.  As it was, Mussina did not play in the All-Star Game, and Ward did not get the save.

Footnotes and references

External links
Baseball Almanac

Major League Baseball All-Star Game
Major League Baseball All-Star Game
Baseball competitions in Baltimore
1990s in Baltimore
Major League Baseball All-Star Game
Major League Baseball All-Star Game